Ann Trombley (born November 22, 1963) is an American cyclist. She competed at the 2000 Summer Olympics in Sydney, in the women's cross-country. Trombley was born in Saginaw, Michigan.

References

1963 births
Living people
American female cyclists
Olympic cyclists of the United States
Cyclists at the 2000 Summer Olympics
Sportspeople from Saginaw, Michigan
21st-century American women